Co-op Live is an indoor arena currently under construction in Manchester, England. As of 2022, the estimated cost of the scheme is £365million.

Developers are planning to include up to 32 bars, a number of restaurants and clubs as part of the complex. Oak View Group is developing the scheme in partnership with The Co-operative Group.

Arena design
The arena is planning to host live music, sports, comedy acts, and family entertainment events. It will have an all-seated maximum capacity of 20,500 (for a centre-stage concert, extending the retractable seating in the lower tier); but with an enhanced maximum capacity of 23,500, of whom 7,500 would be standing, when lower tier seating is retracted. The main ground floor public entrances to the arena will be from the North West with additional access to level 1 from the canalside to the South East. The stage-end will be to the East.

The audience bowl will be approximately square with retractable seating on level 0 and level 1, premium seating on level 2, upper tier seating on level 3, and hospitality lounges overlooking the stage at level 4 from the North and South sides; while the configuration of the auditorium is intended to be optimised for larger-scale touring music performances with a relatively low ceiling (to enhance the acoustic experience), an extensive potential flat floor area at Level 0 for standing, and minimised distances from the upper tiers to the stage. Compared to a more conventional arena bowl of equivalent size, the tiered seats on the Western side of the Co-op Arena are claimed to be around  closer to the performance stage. The promoters state that the interior of the bowl "has been designed to feel like the UK’s largest nightclub".

The arena is planned to host around 120 events per year, 100 of which are planned music events. The design of the arena is primarily focused on hosting live music with Tim Leiweke, the CEO of the Oak View Group, stating that the design "made it about music and started there" as other arena projects had been "compromised by trying to please everyone".

In addition to live music and entertainment, the developers propose basketball, netball, tennis, esports and gymnastics as sports that could be hosted within the dimensions of the arena floor, and for which there was not, at the time, an appropriate larger venue in Manchester capable of hosting championship events. With lower-tier seating retracted, the floor would accommodate a standard ice hockey pad. For events configured with a centre stage or using the arena floor, there will be additional upper-tier seating on the East side; above and behind the normal end-stage position.

See also
 Etihad Campus

References

External links
 

Indoor arenas in England
Sports venues in Manchester
Proposed indoor arenas
Proposed sports venues in the United Kingdom
Indoor arenas under construction